Meiogyne cylindrocarpa, also known as fingersop, is a small tree in the Annonaceae family. It is native to Borneo, Java, the Marianas, New Guinea, Northern Territory, Philippines, Queensland, Vanuatu, and Western Australia. In the Chamorro language it is known as "paipai".

Foliage

Fruit
The fruit is elongated and somewhat cylindrical in shape. It normally measures 1-3 inches (2.5-7.6 centimeters) in length and is red to orange in color when ripe; it is green when unripe. It somewhat resembles a finger, hence the name "fingersop". The flavor is said to be sweet and has been compared to a sapodilla with a floral flavor.

Propagation

Fingersop is typically propagated by seeds, taking anywhere from two weeks to six months to germinate. Plant seeds about a quarter inch deep in moist, well drained soil, and do not allow to dry out, the embryos are rather small and are encased in a thick seedcoat, so a small amount of mold in the younger stages can be beneficial for faster germination. Seedlings of M. c. subsp. cylindrocarpa tend to be smaller, with a bushier form then M. c. subsp. trichocarpa, which is more erect. Trees bear fruit after five to six years, but when grafted, will produce much sooner and develop a smaller, more compact form.

See also
Decaisnea fargesii (dead men's fingers)

References

The Plant List (2013). meiogyne Version 1.1. Published on the Internet; The Plant List (accessed 1 January).

Meiogyne
Flora of Australia
Taxa named by William Burck